"Hot Stuff" is a song by English rock and roll band the Rolling Stones written by Mick Jagger and Keith Richards, for their 1976 album Black and Blue.

Background
"Hot Stuff" was recorded in March, October and December 1975 during the Black and Blue sessions, and is heavily influenced by the disco/funk sounds of the day, with Charlie Watts laying down a heavy drum pattern accompanied by Ollie E. Brown on percussion, Bill Wyman adding a funky bassline, and extensive use of the Wah-wah pedal by guest guitarist Harvey Mandel, formerly of Canned Heat. Mandel plays the lead guitar parts on the song and was one of the guitarists in consideration for replacing the departed Mick Taylor's slot as the Stones' lead guitarist, a position eventually filled by Ron Wood. Billy Preston plays piano on the recording and contributes backing vocals along with Richards and Wood. The video, however, features Wood on guitar playing Mandel's part.

Reception
Cash Box said that it "is a hot disco tune, with driving, fleshed-out R&B overtones." The opening of "Cheap Sunglasses", a 1979 song by ZZ Top, somewhat resembles the opening of "Hot Stuff".

Chart performance 
The song was released as a US promo single from Black and Blue (following the worldwide top 10 hit "Fool to Cry"). "Hot Stuff" was not as successful as its predecessor, reaching  in the United States. Despite the relative failure of the single, the band continued to explore the disco/funk sounds heard on the recording with later albums and singles—their next single, the disco-infused "Miss You", reached the top position in the US two years later.

References

The Rolling Stones songs
1976 songs
Songs written by Jagger–Richards
Music videos directed by Bruce Gowers
Song recordings produced by Jagger–Richards
Music videos directed by Michael Lindsay-Hogg